The Dunham and Miller Show is a morning drive-time radio show on KTCK The Ticket, broadcast in the Dallas-Fort Worth metroplex.  The show, active since 1994, airs from 5:30am to 10:00am on weekday mornings. The Dunham and Miller Show features George Dunham and Craig Miller as the two primary sports hosts, along with Gordon Keith, who adds cultural and comedic commentary. The three hosts are collectively referred to as the Musers, and two of them have been called comic geniuses by Hector Saldana of the San Antonio Express-News.  The show has been nominated for the prestigious Marconi Award on seven separate occasions.  This seventh time they won the Marconi for Major Market Personality's of the Year 2021.  They also have received the Dallas Observers Best Local Sports Radio Show award for 2011.

History
George Dunham and Craig Miller originally met at their alma mater, the University of North Texas, where they crossed paths during Freshman English.  They later alternated hosting duties for show on a campus radio station before eventually moving on to their professional careers. The Dunham and Miller Show was one of the original shows aired on The Ticket when the station debuted in 1994 on 1310 AM in the Dallas-Fort Worth Metroplex. Dunham and Miller added Gordon Keith to their crew in 1995 and have maintained the same core of hosts ever since.

Popularity
The Musers regularly post the highest ratings in Dallas radio among sports shows. In its "Best of Dallas 2011" article, the Dallas Observer noted, "Dunham & Miller are at this point basically lapping the field in Arbitron ratings. Every hour their show attracts twice the ratings as the offerings of ESPN-103.3 FM and KRLD-105.3 FM The Fan. Combined." Dunham and Miller have also been nominated for the Marconi award for National Major Market Personalities of the year two times; they then won the award for Sports Station of the year, along with the rest of The Ticket, in 2007.  The program has been named Best Sports Talk Show by the Dallas Morning News, Fort Worth Star-Telegram, and Dallas Observer. 

The show is known for its use of comedic impressions done by Dunham and Keith, accompanied by the dry humor of Miller. Popular characters have included a fake Jerry Jones and a fake Wade Phillips.

Show schedule
Mon-Fri  @  6:15am – Gordo's O-Deck
Mon-Fri  @  7:10am – Muse in the News (featuring Gordon Keith )
Mon-Fri  @  8:40am – 8:40 Bit
Mon-Fri  @  9:10am – Gordo's Corner
Tuesdays @  8:50am – Biggest Show Coming to Town
Fridays  @  7:30am – Scatter Shooting
Fridays  @  7:50am – Emergency Brake of the Week

Current crew

Hosts
 George Dunham
 Craig Miller
 Gordon Keith

Producer
 Mike Fernandez

Board Operator
 Jeremy Moran

Ticket Tickers
 DJ Ringenberg

References

American sports radio programs